Blas Infante is a station of the Seville Metro on the line 1. It is located at the avenue of Blas Infante, in the neighborhood of Los Remedios. Blas Infante is an underground station, located between San Juan Bajo and Parque de los Príncipes stations on the same line. It was opened on April 2, 2009.

Connections
Bus: 41, M-140, M-150, M-151, M-152, M-153, M-162, M-240

See also
 List of Seville metro stations

References

External links 
  Official site.
 History, construction details and maps.

Seville Metro stations
Railway stations in Spain opened in 2009